Speonoterus bedosae is a species of beetle in the family Noteridae, the only species in the genus Speonoterus.

References

Noteridae